Unexpected is the second studio album by American hip-hop and R&B recording artist Lumidee, released by TVT Records on April 17, 2007 in the United States and on June 21, 2007 in the United Kingdom. The album was produced primarily by J. Marty with contributions made by Scott Storch, T.C. Love, Lenky, Ron Browz, Wyclef Jean, Jerry Duplessis and Red Spyda.

Background
In an interview with Vibe Magazine, Lumidee spoke about signing with TVT Records stating, "TVT Records is the perfect way for me to come back and again I'm coming out of left field, just like with Never Leave You. Nobody ever thought of me coming back on a street credible label like TVT [...] Actually, nobody ever thought of me really even coming back, period."

In another interview, Lumidee said of the album, "This time around I got to do an album. The first time around the world heard my demo, that’s basically what it was. I had a really big song which landed me the deal and they wanted an album in two weeks. [...] This time you’re getting to hear my progress through the years and the different emotions I’ve been going through."

Content
The album was produced primarily by J. Marty, who produced eight out of the seventeen songs. Other contributors include Lenky, who produced "Crazy" featuring Miami rapper Pitbull and Jerry Duplessis, who produced the Kill Bill-inspired track, "The Whistle Song" which features former Fugees member, Wyclef Jean, who co-produced it. According to Lumidee, the idea to record a remake of Patrick Swayze's 1987 song "She's Like The Wind" was inspired by her European label when she recommended a collaboration with fellow New York recording artist Tony Sunshine. She described the album as having "many flavors", including "rap, R&B, Caribbean music, all the sounds that influence me." She also said, "Everything I'm doing is for the world. I’m not just trying to cater to one audience..." Another track, characterized as a "self-described in-your-face song" entitled, "He Told Me" is a reggae and hip-hop flavored song that "once again boasts Lumidee’s ability to effortlessly flow from rapping to singing, all under one title." Blues & Soul describes "Stuck On You" as an "emotionally-pleasing" song that is "backed with a beautiful Spanish guitar". A track titled "Did You Imagine" samples Manu Chao's "Me Gustas Tú" and is a reggaeton-flavored song that explores her Latin roots. Unexpected was named because, as she explained, "It's unexpected to some people that I'm still doing music."

Reception

Commercial performance
Following its release, the album debuted at number forty-four on the U.S. Billboard 200, with about 16,000 copies sold in its first week. On May 5, 2007 Unexpected debuted at number two on the U.S. Billboard Independent Albums chart, remaining on the chart for five weeks.

Critical reception

Andy Kellman of Allmusic said, "There's much more nuance to her voice, whether she's singing or rapping. She's tougher, more womanly." He then ended on a mixed note, "As uneven and occasionally puzzling as a 17-track pop album gets, this is nonetheless a marked improvement over the debut." Blues & Soul gave the album a positive review, commending the quality of the production and called it a "great deal more promise than her debut LP." Entertainment Weekly gave the album a B rating and said that the album is "Nothing for the ages, but pleasantly of the moment".

Singles
On April 3, 2007 "She's Like The Wind" was released as the first single from the album in the United States and Europe. It managed to peak at number forty-three on the U.S. Billboard Hot 100 and in Denmark, it reached the top ten.

The second single, "Crazy" was released on May 22, 2007, in the United States and Europe but charted only on the European charts, including Germany, France, Belgium, Austria, and the United Kingdom.

"Feel Like Makin' Love" was the third and final single from the album released in mid-November 2007. It performed less well than its predecessors, only landing on the Ultratip chart in Flanders.

Track listing
Credits adapted from the album's liner notes

Sample credits
"Cute Boy" contains a portion of "Love and Unity Rhythm" as performed by Henry "Junjo" Lawes.
"He Told Me" contains a portion of "Sunrise Til Sunset" as performed by The Wailing Souls.
"Did You Imagine" samples "Me Gústas Tú" as performed by Manu Chao

Personnel

 Wolfgang Boss: Executive Producer, A&R
 James Eichelberger: A&R
 Jonathan P. Fine: A&R
 Darrell Branch: Producer
 Eddie Perez: Producer
 J. Stars: Producer
 Jerry Duplessis: Producer
 NIV: Arranger, Producer
 Red Spyda: Producer
 Ron Browz: Producer
 Scott Storch: Producer
 Steve Morales: Producer
 Steven "Lenky" Marsden: Producer
 T.C. Love: Producer
 Wyclef Jean: Producer
 Lumidee: Vocals
 Stef Fink: Background Vocals
 Rob Raio: Background Vocals
 Courtney Harrell: Background Vocals
 Alonzo Vargas: Engineer, Mixing
 David Kutch: Mastering
 James Deering: Engineer
 Jarred Elioseff: Keyboards
 J. Mizzle: Keyboards
 Jesus Bobe: Engineer
 John Lardiari: Guitar
 Josh Modney: Violin
 Judy Hyman: Violin
 Julian Vasquez: Engineer
 Keith "Lil Wonda" Duplessis: Guitar
 Logic: Keyboards
 Max Buckholtz: Viola
 Mike DeSalvo: Mixing
 Mintman: Guitar
 Pablo O. Bilbraup: Percussion
 Rich Keller: Bass, Guitar, Mandolin, Mixing
 Samuel Jusino Jr.: Guitar, Engineer
 Sean Harkness: Guitar
 Sedeck Jean: Keyboards
 Stephen L. Joseph: Engineer
 Walter White: Horn, Horn Arrangements, String Arrangements
 Wilner Alexandre: Engineer
 Elliott Thomas: Piano
 Diego Morales: Engineer

Charts

Release history

References

2007 albums
Lumidee albums
TVT Records albums
Albums produced by Ron Browz
Albums produced by Scott Storch
Albums produced by Jerry Duplessis
Albums produced by Wyclef Jean